D-5-ZB-TV is a commercial television station owned by GMA Network Inc. Its transmitter are located at Purok 3, Brgy. Buhangin, Baler, Aurora.

GMA TV-5 Baler programs
One North Central Luzon - flagship afternoon newscast (simulcast on TV-10 Dagupan)
Mornings with GMA Regional TV - flagship morning newscast simulcast on GMA TV-10 Dagupan

References

See also
 DZEA-TV
 DZBB-TV
 List of GMA Network stations

Television channels and stations established in 1999
GMA Network stations
Television stations in Aurora (province)
1999 establishments in the Philippines